Phyllonorycter argentifimbriella is a moth of the family Gracillariidae. It is known from Québec in Canada and Illinois, Kentucky, Pennsylvania, Maine, Maryland, New York, Vermont, Massachusetts, Connecticut and Washington in the United States.

The wingspan is 6.5–7 mm.

The larvae feed on Quercus species, including Quercus alba, Quercus bicolor, Quercus castanea and Quercus prinus. They mine the leaves of their host plant. The mine has the form of a tentiform mine on the underside the leaf. The pupa is suspended in the mine in a thin web.

References

External links
mothphotographersgroup

argentifimbriella
Moths of North America
Moths described in 1859